Unashamed is the ninth studio album by Building 429. Reunion Records released the album on September 25, 2015.

Critical reception

Rating the album four stars from CCM Magazine, Matt Conner describes, "Unashamed follows suit with a radio-ready 10-song set of encouraging songs for the church." Bert Gangl, giving the album three stars for Jesus Freak Hideout, writes, "Neither out and out unpleasant nor completely without merit, the new Building 429 record is nevertheless yet one more installment in an ever-growing anthology of prototypical, run-of-the-mill music likely to find little widespread appeal outside the ranks of the already-converted." Awarding the album four and a half stars at 365 Days of Inspiring Media, Jonathan Andre states, "Unashamed is the band's best work yet, and a testament to their longevity, and their relevance in an industry sadly more focused on radio marketability than artistic integrity, endeavours and creativity". Lauren McLean, rating the album a 4.9 out of five from The Christian Beat, says, "They’ve always put out great, heart-filled music for all ages, but Unashamed is definitely one for the history books." Indicating in an eight out of ten review by Cross Rhythms, Tony Cummings responds, "The truth is 'Unashamed' is [skillfully] crafted pop rock and is probably the band's best ever and demonstrates that the band still have plenty of creative fire to take their message to US youth." DeWayne Hamby, reviewing the album for Charisma, writes, "With Unashamed, Building 429 continues...giving believers music that inspires, and encourages them on their personal journeys."

Track listing

Charts

References

2015 albums
Building 429 albums
Reunion Records albums